Cleat may refer to:
 Cleat (nautical), a fitting on ships, boats, and docks to which ropes are tied
 Cleat, Orkney, a place in Scotland
 Cleat (shoe), a type or part of a shoe
 Cleats (comic strip), a comic strip by Bill Hinds
 Grouser, a protrusion on a wheel or continuous vehicle track, intended to increase traction
 Fractures in coal seams
 French cleat, a type of molding

See also
 Clete